Racław  is a settlement in the administrative district of Gmina Polanów, within Koszalin County, West Pomeranian Voivodeship, in northwestern Poland.

For the history of the region, see History of Pomerania.

References

Villages in Koszalin County